Carlton was a constituency in Nottinghamshire which returned one Member of Parliament (MP)  to the House of Commons of the Parliament of the United Kingdom from 1950 until it was abolished for the 1983 general election.  It was then partly replaced by the new Gedling constituency.

Boundaries 
1950–1974: The Urban Districts of Arnold and Carlton, the Rural District of Bingham, and in the Rural District of Basford the parishes of Burton Joyce, Calverton, Lambley, Stoke Bardolph, and Woodborough.

1974–1983: The Urban Districts of Arnold and Carlton, and in the Rural District of Basford the parishes of Bestwood Park, Burton Joyce, Calverton, Lambley, Linby, Newstead, Papplewick, Stoke Bardolph, and Woodborough.

Members of Parliament

Elections

Elections in the 1950s

Elections in the 1960s

Elections in the 1970s

References 

Parliamentary constituencies in Nottinghamshire (historic)
Constituencies of the Parliament of the United Kingdom established in 1950
Constituencies of the Parliament of the United Kingdom disestablished in 1983